Madelon (French: La Madelon) is a 1955 French comedy film directed by Jean Boyer and starring Line Renaud, Jean Richard and Roger Pierre. It is inspired by the popular song of the First World War "La Madelon" about Madelon, a waitress working in a country inn encountered by a group of soldiers.

The film's sets were designed by the art director Robert Giordani.

Synopsis
In the First World War, Madeleine, a singing waitress who has become of the idol to the French Army travels up to Paris and the Western Front searching for her lover, encountering on the way a variety of different nationalities who make up the Allied forces.

Cast
 Line Renaud as Madeleine Thullier, dite La Madelon
 Jean Richard as Antoine Pichot
 Roger Pierre as Le caporal Georges Beauguitte
 Pierre Larquey as Le curé
 Georges Chamarat as Auguste Thullier 
 André Valmy as Le capitaine Van Meulen
 Gilbert Gil as 	Un commandant d'aviation chez Maxim's
 Jacques Dynam as Le chasseur de chez Maxim's
 Jean Martinelli as Le colonel de Saint-Marc
 Peter Walker as Un Américain
 Michèle Monty as Juliette
 Jess Hahn as Le général américain Gibson
 Émile Genevois as Le soldat Alfred
 Odette Barencey as Mme Thullier 
 Edmond Chemi as Le gendarme qui arrête Antoine 
 Michel Flamme as Un capitaine d'aviation chez Maxim's
 Jacques Hilling as Le soldat qui dort
 Daniel Ceccaldi as Un militaire chez Maxim's
 Georges Baconnet as M. Pichot 
 Robert Dalban as L'adjudant La Tringle
 Robert Rollis as Julot
 Jean Carmet as Le soldat Mathieu
 Noël Roquevert as Le commandant Martin

References

Bibliography 
 Dayna Oscherwitz & MaryEllen Higgins. The A to Z of French Cinema. Scarecrow Press, 2009.

External links 
 

1955 films
French comedy films
1955 comedy films
1950s French-language films
Films directed by Jean Boyer
Films set in the 1910s
French World War I films
French black-and-white films
1950s French films